Robert L. Papa (born September 19, 1964) is an American sportscaster who is currently the radio play-by-play voice for the New York Giants of the National Football League (NFL). Papa also is the lead broadcaster for PGA Tour Champions events on Golf Channel and has been the blow-by-blow announcer on many professional boxing telecasts, notably for ESPN and for HBO’s Boxing After Dark series.

Biography

Early life
Papa grew up in Dumont, New Jersey, and graduated from Bergen Catholic High School in nearby Oradell. He graduated from Fordham University in 1986. His brother is not comedian Tom Papa. He is not related to the San Francisco Bay Area sports broadcaster (and former long-time Oakland Raiders radio voice) Greg Papa.

Career

New York Giants (1995–present)
He is best known as the radio play-by-play voice of the New York Giants, a position he has held since he replaced Jim Gordon prior to the 1995 season.

He announces all 17 regular season games and all postseason games on the radio, and all of the team's pre-season games for WNBC in New York City and simulcast across the state. During his time with the Giants, he has called the team's victories in Super Bowl XLII and Super Bowl XLVI, as well as their loss to the Baltimore Ravens in Super Bowl XXXV.

From 1988 to 1994, he worked on the Giants' pregame and postgame shows on the radio. His work with the Giants also includes his role as host of the YES Network's Giants Training Camp Report, and Giants Access Blue, Giants Chronicles, and Giants Online.

Other Work
Additionally, Papa was the voice of Thursday Night Football on NFL Network until 2010. He files pregame and postgame reports from New York Giants games on Sundays for NFL GameDay Morning and contributes to NFL.com with columns, chats and reports. He works for the Golf Channel during the NFL off-season.

In addition, he was added as a member for Golf Channel and has called boxing for HBO, SportsChannel America, ESPN, NBC, and Versus. Papa called the infamous November 23, 2001, match between James Butler and Richard Grant on Friday Night Fights.

At fight's end, after Grant had been declared the winner, Butler sucker-punched Grant, breaking his jaw. Both Papa and his color commentator, Teddy Atlas, loudly called for both Butler's arrest, and permanent suspension from boxing. Butler later pleaded guilty to the slaying of artist/writer Sam Kellerman.

Papa was the radio voice for the New Jersey Nets on WOR for several years in the mid-1990s after Ian Eagle was promoted to television.

From 1989–92, he was the studio host for NHL on SportsChannel America. Denis Potvin was his analyst. From 2008 to 2010, he did play-by-play on NFL games that took place on NFL Network before being replaced by Brad Nessler.

Papa currently hosts "Airing It Out," along with Charlie Weis, on Sirius XM NFL Radio.

Olympics
A graduate of Fordham University, Papa, along with two more alumni, participated in the 2004 Summer Olympics held in Athens. Papa worked on NBC's coverage of the Olympics since 1992, as he covered boxing at the 2008 Summer Olympics.

In 2002, he covered cross-country skiing and curling. In 2010, he covered luge, skeleton, and bobsled. He served as the play by play announcer for NBC Sports coverage of Boxing at the 2008 Summer Olympics. He called Rugby at the 2016 Summer Olympics.

Personal life
Papa has four sons: Christopher, Will, Nicholas, and Max.

References

1964 births
Living people
American radio sports announcers
American television sports announcers
Golf writers and broadcasters
Arena football announcers
Bergen Catholic High School alumni
Boxing commentators
College basketball announcers in the United States
College football announcers
Curling broadcasters
Gabelli School of Business alumni
National Basketball Association broadcasters
National Football League announcers
National Hockey League broadcasters
NFL Europe broadcasters
New York Giants announcers
New Jersey Nets announcers
People from Dumont, New Jersey
Olympic Games broadcasters
WFUV people